Daniela Schmitt (born 5 August 1972) is a German politician of the Free Democratic Party (FDP) who has been serving as State Minister for Economics, Transport, Agriculture and Viticulture in the state government of Rhineland-Palatinate since 2021. From 2013 until 2021, she was Secretary of State for Economic Affairs, Transport, Agriculture and Viticulture under minister Volker Wissing.

Since 2013, Schmitt has also been deputy leader of the state FDP and a member of the party's federal executive.

Education and early career
After completing an apprenticeship as a bank clerk, Schmitt studied financial business administration and successfully completed her degree at the Frankfurt School of Finance & Management in 2011. From 2011 to 2016 she was director of the Bingen/Ingelheim and Mainz regional markets of the Mainzer Volksbank and honorary commercial judge at the Mainz regional court.

Political career
Following the 2016 state elections, Schmitt joined the government of Minister-President Malu Dreyer, deputising Minister Volker Wissing. Since 2013, she has also been deputy chairwoman of the FDP in Rhineland-Palatinate under Wissing's leadership and a member of the party's federal executive under the leadership of chairman Christian Lindner.

In 2020, Schmitt was nominated as the FDP's lead candidate for the 2021 Rhineland-Palatinate state election.

As one of the state's representatives at the Bundesrat since 2021, Schmitt serves on the Committee on Agriculture and Consumer Protection, the Committee on Economic Affairs and the Committee on Transport. She is also a member of the German-French Friendship Group set up by the Bundesrat and the French Senate as well as of the German-Polish Friendship Group set up in cooperation with the Senate of Poland.

In the negotiations to form a so-called traffic light coalition of the Social Democratic Party (SPD), the Green Party and the FDP on the national level following the 2021 German elections, Schmitt was part of her party's delegation in the working group on economic affairs, co-chaired by Carsten Schneider, Cem Özdemir and Michael Theurer.

Schmitt was nominated by her party as delegate to the Federal Convention for the purpose of electing the President of Germany in 2022.

Other activities
 Germany Trade and Invest (GTAI), Member of the Supervisory Board
 University of Applied Sciences Bingen, Member of the Board of Trustees (since 2012)

References

1972 births
Living people
People from Alzey
Free Democratic Party (Germany) politicians
21st-century German politicians
21st-century German women politicians